Robert Austen may refer to:
 Robert Austen (1642–1696), MP for Winchelsea
Robert Austen (c. 1672–1728), MP for Winchelsea and Hastings
Sir Robert Austen, 1st Baronet (1587–1666), Austen Baronet and one-time owner of Hall Place
Sir Robert Austen, 3rd Baronet (1664–1706), English politician
Sir Robert Austen, 4th Baronet (1697–1743), MP for New Romney

See also
Robert Austin (disambiguation)
Bobby Austin (disambiguation)
Robert Alfred Cloyne Godwin-Austen (1808–1884), English geologist